The Marshall Smith House is a historic house at 26 Liberty Street in Waltham, Massachusetts.  The -story wood-frame house was built c. 1846–47; it is one of the city's few side-gable Greek Revival houses, with a single-story Doric porch spanning the main facade, a full entablature, and pedimented gable ends.  The porch balustrade is a later addition, as are the western ell and northern window bay.  Marshall Smith, the first owner, was a chair and harness maker.

The house was listed on the National Register of Historic Places in 1989.

See also
National Register of Historic Places listings in Waltham, Massachusetts

References

Houses on the National Register of Historic Places in Waltham, Massachusetts
Houses completed in 1846
Houses in Waltham, Massachusetts